The 1979–80 season was the 56th season in the existence of AEK Athens F.C. and the 21st consecutive season in the top flight of Greek football. They competed in the Alpha Ethniki, the Greek Cup and the European Cup. The season began on 19 September 1979 and finished on 24 May 1980.

Overview

The enactment of law 879/79 from March 1979 led Greek football to full professionalism and men of a large financial surface stepped on the surface. The Vardinogiannis family took over the wheel of Panathinaikos, with Yiorgos Vardinogiannis as president and a group of shipowners led by Stavros Daifas took over the ownership Olympiacos. On 30 July, AEK was also converted into a S.A. under the leadership of Loukas Barlos. Barlos realizing that it was impossible to compete financially with his rivals of and having an aversion to the professionalization of sports, he was preparing the ground for his departure. His last great offer to AEK and the Greek football, was the construction of the first two-story podium in a Greek stadium on October 7, when in Nea Filadelfeia the much-loved "Skepasti" (The Covered) was inaugurated. Transferwise, AEK was mostly staffed by the first talents that emerged from their famous academies managed by František Fadrhonc. The position of a foreigner which was vacated by the departure of Milton Viera, was covered by Franjo Vladić, Dušan Bajević's alter ego for many years at Velež Mostar. Barlos played his "last card" and brought to the bench of AEK the Austrian champion with Austria Wien, Hermann Stessl.

Τhe draw brought AEK against the Romanian Argeș Pitești for the First Round of the European Cup. That caused feelings of euphoria in the team and the fans of AEK as the triumph against Porto at the last season's First Round was still fresh. At the Stadionul 1 Mai, AEK were left with ten players due to the dismissal of Damianidis from the 52nd minute and the Romanians got the victory and a relative safe score of 3–0. Despite the heavy loss of the first match, the conditions under which this occurred, allowed AEK to be optimistic for the replay match. In Nea Filadelfeia, AEK were tasked for the comeback once again in their history. At the beginning of the game they showed that they were capable of that as they opened the score at the 13th minute, an own goal by Ivan and after 7 minutes, Vladić doubled their advantage. AEK had more than an hour to score a third goal that would equalize the score of the first match. However, that goal did not take place thanks to the Swiss referee, André Daina, who denied AEK three clear penalties and the possibility of the qualification to the next round. The anger of the AEK players and staff overflowed and the incidents that followed in the locker room and the referees' room brought the punishment of AEK with a one-year ban from the European competitions by UEFA.

AEK started the championship quietly and was left behind in the standings. In the Greek Cup, AEK eliminated Panachaiki at the first round, Panetolikos at the second round, only to be eliminated by PAOK in Thessaloniki, at the round of 16. The introduction of the winter transfer period brought by the professionalism of football contributed to the weakening of the roster, as Mimis Domazos left for Panathinaikos, Takis Nikoloudis for Olympiacos and Dionysis Tsamis for Korinthos. AEK recovered in a great deal afterwards, but a series of unfortunate results brought the dismissal of Stessl in April and the veteran AEK player Miltos Papapostolou on the bench with the help of Fadrhonc. The team returned to the successful results and assisted significantly by the 25 goals of Bajević who emerged as the legue's top scorer, finished tied with Panathinaikos in the third place, two points behind the equal in the first place Olympiacos and Aris. This tie led to play-off matches for both the first place for the championship and the third place for a ticket to the UEFA Cup.

The play-off match between AEK and Panathinaikos was from all sides a very strange match. AEK had already been punished with exclusion from the European Cups by UEFA, which meant that whatever the result of the game, Panathinaikos would play in the UEFA Cup. If AEK won, they would simply had the benefit of serving their sentence immediately. The people of Panathinaikos implied that they did not want the match to take place. Barlos, showing a high sense of honor and having in mind the incident of Olympiacos not showing up in the last season's play-off match against AEK, demanded the match to be held, regardless of any risk for his team. On May 24 at Karaiskaki Stadium, the crowd witnessed the honesty that defined Barlos' team, regardless of their eventual 1–0 loss, which marked the beginning of the club's absence from the UEFA competitions.

Players

Squad information

NOTE: The players are the ones that have been announced by the AEK Athens' press release. No edits should be made unless a player arrival or exit is announced. Updated 30 June 1980, 23:59 UTC+3.

Transfers

In

Summer

Winter

Out

Summer

Winter

Loan out

Summer

Renewals

Overall transfer activity

Expenditure
Summer:  ₯13,500,000

Winter:  ₯0

Total:  ₯13,500,000

Income
Summer:  ₯0

Winter:  ₯0

Total:  ₯0

Net Totals
Summer:  ₯13,500,000

Winter:  ₯0

Total:  ₯13,500,000

Pre-season and friendlies

Alpha Ethniki

League table

Results summary

Results by Matchday

Fixtures

3rd-place play-off

Greek Cup

Matches

European Cup

First round

Statistics

Squad statistics

! colspan="11" style="background:#FFDE00; text-align:center" | Goalkeepers
|-

! colspan="11" style="background:#FFDE00; color:black; text-align:center;"| Defenders
|-

! colspan="11" style="background:#FFDE00; color:black; text-align:center;"| Midfielders
|-

! colspan="11" style="background:#FFDE00; color:black; text-align:center;"| Forwards
|-

! colspan="11" style="background:#FFDE00; color:black; text-align:center;"| Left during Winter Transfer Window
|-

|}

Disciplinary record

|-
! colspan="17" style="background:#FFDE00; text-align:center" | Goalkeepers

|-
! colspan="17" style="background:#FFDE00; color:black; text-align:center;"| Defenders

|-
! colspan="17" style="background:#FFDE00; color:black; text-align:center;"| Midfielders

|-
! colspan="17" style="background:#FFDE00; color:black; text-align:center;"| Forwards

|-
! colspan="17" style="background:#FFDE00; color:black; text-align:center;"| Left during Winter Transfer Window

|}

References

External links
AEK Athens F.C. Official Website

AEK Athens F.C. seasons
AEK Athens